Cerro is an unincorporated community in Taos County, New Mexico, United States located along New Mexico State Road 378. It was founded in 1854 by settlers from Taos and Questa and was named for Cerro Guadalupe.

See also
 Wild Rivers Recreation Area

Notes

Unincorporated communities in Taos County, New Mexico
Unincorporated communities in New Mexico